Txema del Olmo Zendegi (born 26 April 1973 in Bilbao) is a Spanish former professional cyclist. He rode in 4 grand tours, including 3 editions of the Vuelta a España and 1 Tour de France.

Major results

1997
 3rd Memorial Manuel Galera
 3rd Clásica Memorial Txuma
1998
 2nd Overall Tour de l'Avenir
1st Stage 8
2000
 10th Overall Tour of the Basque Country

References

External links

1973 births
Living people
Spanish male cyclists
Sportspeople from Bilbao
Cyclists from the Basque Country (autonomous community)